The 2006 K League was the 24th season of the K League, which kicked off on March 12. The format of the regular season and playoffs was the same as the one used in the 2005 season. It took a break for the 2006 FIFA World Cup in June and July. The playoff games were held in November.

SK Group, the owners of Bucheon SK, moved their club to Jeju, and renamed the club Jeju United. The club was based in the Jeju World Cup Stadium of Seogwipo. Gyeongnam FC joined the K League, increasing the number of clubs to fourteen.

Regular season

First stage

League table
The first place team qualified for the championship playoffs.

Results

Second stage

League table
The first place team qualified for the championship playoffs.

Results

Overall table
The top two teams in the overall table qualified for the championship playoffs.

Championship playoffs

Bracket

Final table

Top scorers
This list includes goals of the championship playoffs.

Awards

Main awards

Best XI

Source:

See also
 2006 in South Korean football
 2006 K League Championship
 2006 Korean League Cup
 2006 Korean FA Cup

References

External links
 RSSSF

K League seasons
1
South Korea
South Korea